The EMET Prize for Art, Science and Culture is an Israeli prize awarded annually for excellence in academic and professional achievements that have far-reaching influence and make a significant contribution to society.
Prizes are awarded in the following five categories: the Exact Sciences, Life Sciences, Social Sciences, Humanities, and Culture and the Arts.

The prizes, in a total amount of one million dollars, are sponsored by the A.M.N. Foundation for the Advancement of Science, Art and Culture in Israel, under the auspices of and in cooperation with the Prime Minister of Israel. It is awarded to Israeli citizens, and in certain circumstances to non-citizens who reside in Israel and consider Israel as their permanent home.

The EMET Prize is administered by the Award Committee, composed of representatives appointed by the Prime Minister and the A.M.N. Foundation. Currently, the Chairman of the Award Committee is retired Supreme Court Justice Jacob Turkel.

EMET Prize Laureates

2021

2020

2019

2018

2017

2016

2015

2014

2013

2012

2011

2010

2009

2008

2007

2006

2005

2004

2003

2002

References

External links
 THE EMET Prize for Art, Science and Culture (official website)

Israeli awards
Arts awards in Israel
Awards established in 2002
2002 establishments in Israel